William Halley was a Scottish professional football right back who played in the Football League for Bolton Wanderers.

Career statistics

References

Year of death missing
Association football fullbacks
Bolton Wanderers F.C. players
Bedminster F.C. players
Roman Glass St George F.C. players
Millwall F.C. players
Brentford F.C. players
English Football League players
Southern Football League players
Western Football League players
Place of death missing
Sportspeople from Clackmannanshire
1874 births
Scottish footballers